Aganodine is a guanidine that activates presynaptic imidazoline receptors. Through its agonism at imidazoline receptors, aganodine inhibits the presynaptic release of norepinephrine.

References

Guanidines
Chloroarenes